Nikolai Kiut was Minister of Culture of the Abkhazian ASSR from 1967 to 1973. Kiut was born in 1910 into a peasant family in the village Kindgi in Ochamchira District and died in 1986.

References

1910 births
1986 deaths
People from Ochamchira District
Ministers for Culture of Abkhazia
Soviet politicians